Qujie (Chinese: t , s , p Qūjiè Zhèn) is a town on southern China's Leizhou Peninsula southeast of the dormant Tianyang volcano. It is part of Zhanjiang's Xuwen County in Guangdong province.

References

Zhanjiang
Towns in Guangdong